Pandalus platyceros, also called California spot prawn (as well as Santa Barbara spot prawn and Monterey Bay spot prawn) or Alaskan prawn, is a shrimp of the genus Pandalus.

Spot shrimp are a large shrimp found in the North Pacific. They range from the clean waters off Unalaska Island, Alaska, to San Diego.
The commercial spot prawn fishery along the British Columbia coast is considered sustainable ("occur in sufficient numbers to support several small commercial and recreational fisheries") and provides the largest landed value to the BC shrimp fishery.

Distribution 
Pandalus platyceros are found throughout the marine waters of the North Pacific Ocean. While found living from 3.7 meters to 457.2 meters, spot shrimp are most often found around 109.7 meters below sea level.

Description 
Spot prawn reach up to 27 centimeters in length, with females often longer than their male counterparts. Spot shrimp have a translucent, reddish carapace with white stripes and pereopods and antennae which are banded dark and light red. Their first and fifth abdominal segments have white spots.

References 

Caridea
Crustaceans described in 1851